Arivazhagan Venkatachalam is an Indian film director in Tamil cinema known for his 2009 thriller film Eeram.

Career
Arivazhagan Venkatachalam is a gold medalist from the M.G.R. Government Film and Television Training Institute. He went on to assist Shankar. In 2009, he made his directorial debut with Eeram, which was produced by Shankar's production house, S Pictures. The film, with an unusual theme and plot, went on to become a huge hit. Arivazhagan's second film was Vallinam, which was produced by V. Ravichandran. The film was a very bold attempt, as sports dramas were made less frequently in Tamil cinema. Like Eeram, it too went on to become a sleeper hit at the box-office. 

His third directorial, Kuttram 23, was received fairly lesser than his first two films, however, the theme and Arun Vijay's performance were highly praised. It was a profitable venture. He then remade Memories in Tamil as Aarathu Sinam, with Arulnithi. It was fairly successful at the box-office. He reunited with Arun Vijay, again, for the web series, Tamil Rockerz, and his fifth directorial, Borrder.

Filmography

References

External links
 

Film directors from Tamil Nadu
Tamil film directors
Living people
M.G.R. Government Film and Television Training Institute alumni
21st-century Indian film directors
People from Salem district
Tamil screenwriters
Screenwriters from Tamil Nadu
Year of birth missing (living people)